HMS Wrestler (D35) was a  built by the Royal Navy during the First World War and active from 1939 to 1944 during the Second World War. She was the first Royal Navy ship to bear that name, and the only one to do so to date.

Construction
She was the tenth order in the 1916–1917 programme, ordered on 9 December 1916 from Swan Hunter. She was laid down at Wallsend during July 1917, launched on 25 February 1918 and commissioned on 15 May that year, too late to see active service in the war. In the month of Wrestlers commissioning the battleship  collided with Wrestler and badly damaged her.

Service history
Wrestler′s first deployment was in 1921, to the Atlantic Fleet's 5th Destroyer Flotilla. On 8 October 1921, the American steamer  rammed the British passenger ship  from astern in fog in the North Channel. Her passengers were mustered on deck. The British steamer  then rammed Rowan from starboard and cut her in two. Rowan sank with the loss of 22 of the 97 people on board. Wrestler joined Clan Malcolm and West Camak in rescuing survivors from Rowan.

The 5th Destroyer Flotilla visited the Mediterranean in 1925. The flotilla returned to the United Kingdom during the 1930s on the commissioning of new destroyers and Wrestler was placed in reserve.

From there she joined the 13th Destroyer Flotilla to defend convoys in the early stages of the Battle of the Atlantic. During 1940 she escorted Convoy OG 22F alongside  and  through the Western Approaches on its way to Gibraltar in March.

From July 1941 to April 1942 she was stationed at Freetown and was then transferred to the Malta Convoys as part of Force H and "Operation Harpoon", before serving as one of the naval escorts for "Operation Torch". She was adopted by Hyde in December 1941 after a successful "Warship Week" National Savings campaign. In July 1942 Wrestler also boarded the Vichy French merchantman Mitidja (intercepted off Cape Palos, Spain by ) and escorted her into Gibraltar.

Wrestler underwent reconstruction as a Long Range Escort from January to May 1943 at HM Dockyard Sheerness before taking part in "Operation Husky" off Sicily until July that year, when she returned to Atlantic and Russian convoy duties. On 6 June 1944, whilst participating in "Operation Neptune" (the naval side of D-Day), she was mined off Juno Beach and declared a constructive total loss, being sold off on 20 July as scrap.

Battle honours
 Mediterranean 1940–42
 Atlantic 1940–43
 Malta Convoys 1942
 North Africa 1943
 Sicily 1943
 Arctic 1943–44
 Normandy 1944
 English Channel 1944

See also
 Vice-Admiral Sir Gerard "Ged" Mansfield who served on the ship during the Second World War.

References

Bibliography

External links
  Service Histories of Royal Navy warships in World War II : HMS Wrestler
 uboat.net: HMS Wrestler (D35)

 

V and W-class destroyers of the Royal Navy
1918 ships
World War II destroyers of the United Kingdom
Maritime incidents in June 1944
Ships built by Swan Hunter